FC Zličín is a football club located in Prague-Zličín, Czech Republic. It currently plays in the Prague Championship.

Honours
Prague Championship (fifth tier)
 Champions 2009–10

References

External links
 Official website 
 FC Zličín at the website of the Prague Football Association  

Football clubs in the Czech Republic
Football clubs in Prague
Association football clubs established in 1929